The women's 10,000 metres at the 2008 Summer Olympics took place on 15 August at the Beijing National Stadium. The race was won by Tirunesh Dibaba of Ethiopia, who set a new Olympic record time of 29:54.66.

The qualifying standards were 31:45.00 (A standard) and 32:20.00 (B standard).

The early part of the race was dominated by Lornah Kiplagat.  But in the second half of the race, the contenders moved to the front, dominated by Elvan Abeylegesse, with the string of runners lined up behind her.  Abeylegesse separated herself from the rest of the field, except for Tirunesh Dibaba, who marked her every step.  Midway through the last lap, Dibaba pounced with a kick Abeylegesse couldn't answer.  Almost a half a minute back, Shalane Flanagan was the best of the rest for bronze, with Linet Chepkwemoi Masai setting the World junior record a few steps behind her.

At the time Dibaba and Abeylegesse ran the second and third fastest of all time (the best having occurred also in Beijing, Junxia Wang's world record in 1993).  A year after this race, Meselech Melkamu edged past these two for the second best of all time.

On 29 March 2017, IAAF confirmed that Abeylegesse had tested positive for a banned substance at the 2007 World Championships in Athletics, and that her results from 2007 to 2009, including her Olympic silvers, had been expunged.

Records
Prior to this competition, the existing world and Olympic records were as follows:

The following new Olympic record was set during this competition.

Both Tirunesh Dibaba and Elvan Abeylegesse completed the race in a time under the old Olympic record, recording the second and third fastest ever women's 10,000 metre times, making Dibaba the new Olympic record holder.

Results

Splits

References

Athletics at the 2008 Summer Olympics
10,000 metres at the Olympics
2008 in women's athletics
Women's events at the 2008 Summer Olympics